Shi Yang  (施扬, born 4 January 1989, in Shanghai) is a Chinese swimmer. He competed for China at the 2012 Summer Olympics in the men's 50 m freestyle.

References

1989 births
Living people
Chinese male butterfly swimmers
Swimmers from Shanghai
Swimmers at the 2012 Summer Olympics
Olympic swimmers of China
Asian Games medalists in swimming
Swimmers at the 2014 Asian Games
Asian Games gold medalists for China
Medalists at the 2014 Asian Games
Chinese male freestyle swimmers
21st-century Chinese people